The Rubik's Cube group is a group  that represents the structure of the Rubik's Cube mechanical puzzle. Each element of the set  corresponds to a cube move, which is the effect of any sequence of rotations of the cube's faces. With this representation, not only can any cube move be represented, but also any position of the cube as well, by detailing the cube moves required to rotate the solved cube into that position. The group operation  is the composition of cube moves, corresponding to the result of performing one cube move after another.   

The Rubik's Cube group is constructed by labeling each of the 48 non-center facets with the integers 1 to 48. Each configuration of the cube can be represented as a permutation of the labels 1 to 48, depending on the position of each facet. Using this representation, the solved cube is the identity permutation which leaves the cube unchanged, while the twelve cube moves that rotate a layer of the cube 90 degrees are represented by their respective permutations. The Rubik's Cube group is the subgroup of the symmetric group  generated by the six permutations corresponding to the six clockwise cube moves. With this construction, any configuration of the cube reachable through a sequence of cube moves is within the group. Its operation  refers to the composition of two permutations; within the cube, this refers to combining two sequences of cube moves together, doing one after the other. The Rubik's Cube group is non-abelian as composition of cube moves is not commutative; doing two sequences of cube moves in a different order can result in a different configuration.

Cube moves

A  Rubik's Cube consists of  faces, each with  colored squares called facets, for a total of  facets. A solved cube has all of the facets on each face having the same color.

A center facet rotates about its axis but otherwise stays in the same position.

Cube moves are described with the Singmaster notation:

Group structure

The following uses the notation described in How to solve the Rubik's Cube. The orientation of the six centre facets is fixed.

We can identify each of the six face rotations as elements in the symmetric group on the set of non-center facets.  More concretely, we can label the non-center facets by the numbers 1 through 48, and then identify the six face rotations as elements of the symmetric group S48 according to how each move permutes the various facets.  The Rubik's Cube group, G, is then defined to be the subgroup of S48 generated by the 6 face rotations, .

The cardinality of G is given by 
.
Despite being this large, God's Number for Rubik's Cube is 20; that is, any position can be solved in 20 or fewer moves (where a half-twist is counted as a single move; if a half-twist is counted as two quarter-twists, then God's number is 26).

The largest order of an element in G is 1260. For example, one such element of order 1260 is 
.

That is, not all cube moves commute with each other.

Subgroups
We consider two subgroups of G: First the subgroup Co of cube orientations, the moves that leave the position of every block fixed, but can change the orientations of blocks. This group is a normal subgroup of G. It can be represented as the normal closure of some moves that flip a few edges or twist a few corners. For example, it is the normal closure of the following two moves:

 (twist two corners)
 (flip two edges).

Second, we take the subgroup  of cube permutations, the moves which can change the positions of the blocks, but leave the orientation fixed. For this subgroup there are several choices, depending on the precise way you define orientation. One choice is the following group, given by generators (the last generator is a 3 cycle on the edges):

Since Co is a normal subgroup and the intersection of Co and Cp is the identity and their product is the whole cube group, it follows that the cube group G is the semi-direct product of these two groups. That is

Next we can take a closer look at these two groups. The structure of Co is

Noticing that there are 8 corners and 12 edges, and that all the rotation groups are abelian, gives the above structure.

Cube permutations, Cp, is a little more complicated. It has the following two disjoint normal subgroups: the group of even permutations on the corners A8 and the group of even permutations on the edges A12. Complementary to these two subgroups is a permutation that swaps two corners and swaps two edges. It turns out that these generate all possible permutations, which means

Putting all the pieces together we get that the cube group is isomorphic to

This group can also be described as the subdirect product 
, 
in the notation of Griess.

Generalizations
When the centre facet symmetries are taken into account, the symmetry group is a subgroup of

 

(This unimportance of centre facet rotations is an implicit example of a quotient group at work, shielding the reader from the full automorphism group of the object in question.)

The symmetry group of the Rubik's Cube obtained by disassembling and reassembling it is slightly larger: namely it is the direct product

 

The first factor is accounted for solely by rotations of the centre pieces, the second solely by symmetries of the corners, and the third solely by symmetries of the edges. The latter two factors are examples of generalized symmetric groups, which are themselves examples of wreath products.

Conjugacy classes 
It has been reported that the Rubik's Cube Group has 81,120 conjugacy classes. The number was calculated by counting the number of even and odd conjugacy classes in the edge and corner groups separately and then multiplying them, ensuring that the total parity is always even. Special care must be taken to count so-called parity-sensitive conjugacy classes, whose elements always differ when conjugated with any even element versus any odd element.

See also

Commutator
Conjugacy class
Coset
Optimal solutions for Rubik's Cube
Solvable group
Thistlethwaite's algorithm

Notes

References

Finite groups
Permutation groups
Rubik's Cube